Phyllophaga hirticula is a species of scarab beetle in the family Scarabaeidae. It is found in North America.

Subspecies
These two subspecies belong to the species Phyllophaga hirticula:
 Phyllophaga hirticula comosa Davis, 1920 i c g
 Phyllophaga hirticula hirticula (Knoch, 1801) i g
Data sources: i = ITIS, c = Catalogue of Life, g = GBIF, b = Bugguide.net

References

Further reading

 

Melolonthinae
Articles created by Qbugbot
Beetles described in 1801